Dioxycanus is a genus of moths of the family Hepialidae. There are 2 described species, both endemic to New Zealand.

Species 
 Dioxycanus fusca
 Dioxycanus oreas

External links 
 Hepialidae genera

Hepialidae
Moths of New Zealand
Taxa named by Lionel Jack Dumbleton
Exoporia genera